This list contains populated places in the United States listed with African-American majority populations in the 2010 census.

Alabama
Bessemer (72%)
Birmingham (73.4%)
Montgomery (56.6%)
Prichard (85.8%)

California
Baldwin Hills, Los Angeles (78.5%)
Broadway Heights, San Diego 
Ladera Heights (73.7%)
View Park–Windsor Hills (84.8%)
West Athens (52.4%)

District of Columbia
Washington (50.7%)

Georgia
Atlanta (54%)
Savannah (55%)

Michigan
Beecher (57.5%)
Benton Harbor (89.2%)
Benton Heights (65.6%)
Benton Charter Township (51.9%)
Buena Vista (69.3%)
Buena Vista Charter Township (55.6%)
Detroit (82.7%)
Flint (56.6%)
Highland Park (93.5%)
Inkster (73.2%)
Muskegon Heights (78.3%)
Oak Park (57.4%)
Pontiac (51.0%)
River Rouge (50.5%)
Royal Oak Charter Township (95.3%)
Southfield (70.3%)

Missouri
Bel-Ridge (83.1%)
Bellefontaine Neighbors (72.7%)
Berkeley (81.8%)
Beverly Hills (92.7%)
Black Jack (82.1%)
Castle Point (92.9%)
Cool Valley (84.5%)
Country Club Hills (90.9%)
Dellwood (79.2%)
Ferguson (67.4%)
Flordell Hills (90.8%)
Greendale (68.5%)
Jennings (89.8%)
Kinloch (94.6%)
Moline Acres (92.1%)
Normandy (69.7%)
Northwoods (93.9%)

Ohio
Cleveland (53.3%)

Texas
DeSoto (68.6%)
Lancaster (68.75%)

See also
 List of U.S. communities with African-American majority populations in 2000
 List of U.S. communities with Hispanic- or Latino-majority in the 2010 census

African American 2010
African-American demographics